Gedman is a surname. Notable people with the surname include:

Gene Gedman (1932–1974), American football player
Marissa Gedman, American ice hockey player
Rich Gedman (born 1959), American baseball player
Brady Gedman (born 2005), American ice hockey player